Freude (German: "joy") may refer to:

People
Rodolfo Freude (1922–2003) advisor to Argentine President Juan Perón

Culture
Die Freude reget sich, BWV 36b, 1735 cantata by Johann Sebastian Bach
Freude Freude über Freude, a 1744 work; see List of cantatas by Christoph Graupner
Freude, second hour piece for two harps in the 2005 cycle Klang (Stockhausen) by Karlheinz Stockhausen

See also
An die Freude; see Ode to Joy
Jesu, meine Freude, hymn
Jesu, meine Freude, BWV 227, 1723 motet by Johann Sebastian Bach
Kraft durch Freude; see Strength Through Joy
Freud (disambiguation)
Surnames from nicknames